Lüneburg Heath Nature Park (German: Naturpark Lüneburger Heide) is a nature park, a form of protected environment, located in the Lüneburg Heath in northern Germany.

Geography 

The nature park belongs to the former province (Regierungsbezirk) of Lüneburg and, after its expansion in 2007, extends into the districts of Harburg, Lüneburg and Heidekreis. The Lüneburg Heath Nature Park is bordered in the north by Buchholz, in the east by Lüneburg, in the south by Soltau and in the west by Neuenkirchen. By the beginning of 2007 the area of the nature reserve almost coincided with the area of the nature park. The areas added included various protected areas (Landschaftsschutzgebiete).

Legal status
The park is one of 98 nature parks in Germany. They were established under section 22, paragraph 4 of the Federal Nature Conservation Act (BNatSchG). They comprise about 25% of the total land area of Germany and are linked by the Verband Deutscher Naturparke (Association of German Nature Parks).

Note that this is a separate category from the 14 Nationalparke (national parks) of Germany, under paragraph 24 of the Federal Nature Conservation Act. See List of national parks of Germany.

Nature reserves 
There are some 20 nature reserves (Naturschutzgebiete or NSGs) in the park.

NSGs with an area of more than 100 hectares are:
 Lüneburg Heath Nature Reserve 23,440 ha
 Upper Wümme Depression 1,415 ha
 Kiehnmoor 440 ha
 Upper Fintau valley 416 ha
 Valley of the Kleine Örtze 330 ha
 Schierbruch and Forellenbach valley 250 ha
 Brambostel Moor 105 ha

Protected areas 
There are more than 50 protected landscapes (Landschaftsschutzgebiete or LSGs) in the park.

LSGs with an area of more than 500 hectares are:
 Garlstorfer Wald and the surrounding area 10,383 ha
 Munster-Oerrel 3,476 ha
 Sottorfer Busch 2,589 ha
 Eichenhaine (The Schweineweide) 2,239 ha
 Schwindebeck 1,750 ha
 Rosengarten Kiekeberg Stuvenwald 973 ha
 Woods on the edge of the Raubkammer 824 ha
 Riensheide 759 ha
 Lohbergen 550 ha
 Klecker Wald 517 ha

Natural monuments 
 Glacial erratics, a "century stone" (Jahrhundertstein) near Soderstorf
 Lime trees, oaks, beech, Norway Spruce, Juniper, Myrica gale near Wesseloh, Holly near Soderstorf
 Deposited rocks (Wanderblöcke) at Heimbusch and near Egestorf (see glacial erratics)
 Source of the Schwindebach, a clay pit near Lieste and a "bottomless pit" near Soltau
 Schwalinger Flatt near Neuenkirchen (flat marshy lake from the ice age)

See also 
 List of nature parks in Germany

References

External links 
 Lüneburg Heath Nature Park Association (Verein Naturparkregion Lüneburger Heide)
 Lower Saxon Ministry with other links

Lüneburg Heath
Nature parks in Lower Saxony
Cultural landscapes of Germany